Herrsching am Ammersee is a municipality in Upper Bavaria, Germany, on the east shore of the Ammersee, southwest of Munich. The population is around 8,000 in winter, increasing to 13,000 in summer.

Situated at one terminus of the Munich S-Bahn line S8, the village is popular with travellers for its water-sports and as the starting point of trips to the Benedictine Andechs Abbey. Herrsching is also a stop for touring steamships of the Bavarian Seenschiffahrt or lake fleet.

Prior to the Second World War, Herrsching was home to the Hersching Business School (Reichsfinanzschule Hersching). From 1945 to 1946, the school was converted into a POW hospital and rehab facility for soldiers who had lost limbs.

Main sights
Notable sights include
the lake-front promenade (at about 5 km, the longest one in Germany)
Kurparkschlössl (Little castle), built in 1888 by the artist Ludwig Scheuermann
Historic paddle-wheel steamships Herrsching and Diessen docking at the harbour in summer
St. Martin's church
Zur Post Gasthof from 1567
Archaeological Park, a 7th-century settlement of the Bavarians.

Personality
 Rainer Rene Graf Adelmann von Adelmannsfelden (born 1948), former lawyer
 Arno Assmann (1908–1979), actor
 Martin Benrath (1926–2000), actor
 Helene Böhlau (1856–1940), writer, buried in Widdersberg
 David Coverdale (born 1951), singer of the band Deep Purple 1973-1976 
 Roderich Fick, (1886–1955), architect, lived and worked in the "Old Mill",  Mühlfeld from 1920 to 1955
 Camilla Horn (1903–1996), actress
 Clemens Kuby (born 1947), documentary filmmaker and author
 Christian Morgenstern (1871–1914), poet: his widow Margareta lived from 1919 until her death in 1968 in Breitbrunn.
 Burkard Freiherr von Müllenheim-Rechberg (1910—2003), naval officer and diplomat
 Alfred Ploetz (1860–1940), physician
 Rudi Schuricke (1913–1973), singer, actor, lived from 1955 to 1973 in Herrsching, owner of the former Hotel Seespitz
 Klaus Wennemann (1940–2000), actor
 Harald Winter (born 1953), artist

References

External links

 official website
 Five Lake County tourist information

Starnberg (district)
Ammersee